Bambo-Ouest is a village in the commune of Bouéni in Mayotte.

History

References 

Populated places in Mayotte